Jean-Ricner Bellegarde (born 27 June 1998) is a French professional footballer who plays as a midfielder for Ligue 1 club Strasbourg.

International career
Bellegarde was born in France and is of Haitian descent. He is a youth international for France.

In May 2019, he was named to Haiti's 40-man provisional squad for the 2019 CONCACAF Gold Cup.

References

External links
 
 
 
 
 

1998 births
Living people
Sportspeople from Colombes
Footballers from Hauts-de-Seine
Association football midfielders
French footballers
France under-21 international footballers
France youth international footballers
French sportspeople of Haitian descent
RC Lens players
RC Strasbourg Alsace players
Ligue 1 players
Ligue 2 players